Pryor Glacier is a glacier flowing northeastward, to the north of Mount Shields and Yermak Point, into Rennick Bay. The feature is about 30 nautical miles (60 km) long and forms a physical separation between Wilson Hills and Usarp Mountains. Mapped by United States Geological Survey (USGS) from surveys and U.S. Navy aerial photographs, 1960–62. Named by Advisory Committee on Antarctic Names (US-ACAN) for Madison E. Pryor, scientific leader at McMurdo Station (1959) and U.S. Exchange Scientist at the Soviet Mirny Station (1962).

See also
Wagner Spur

Glaciers of Pennell Coast